This list of episodes of Conan details information on the 2015 episodes of Conan, a television program on TBS hosted by Conan O'Brien.

2015

January

February

March

April

May

June

July

August

September

October

November

December

References

Episodes (2015)
Conan episodes
Conan